Baghdad Texas is a comedy film directed by David H. Hickey and stars Al No'Mani, Robert Prentiss, Melinda Renna, Barry Tubb, Ryan Boggus and Shaneye Ferrell. The writers include Shaneye Ferrell, David H. Hickey and Al No'Mani. The movie was produced by Booka Michel. The film has had a number of festival screenings and had its official theatrical release at the Quad Cinema in New York City on August 27, 2010. it is the first notable American film to feature an Iraqi actor.

Plot
Brando, an Iraqi dictator, ends up in a town near the US-Mexico border when his plane crashes. He is then escorted to Texas by illegal immigrants.
His identity is then exposed when he is taken in by a Latino woman.

Cast
Al No'Mani as Brando
Robert Prentiss as Randall
Melinda Renna as Carmen
Barry Tubb as Seth
Ryan Boggus as Limon
Shaneye Ferrell as Kathy

Reviews
The New York Times said, "the premise had promise, but “Baghdad, Texas,” a clumsy comedy directed by David H. Hickey, quickly disappoints with an inconsistent tone and painful overacting."

Slant Magazine said, "Although Baghdad Texas doesn’t really work as a comedy, or as an allegory on border diplomacy and war, its imagination is both honest and authentic."

References

External links
Official Website

Yahoo! Movies

2009 films
2009 comedy films
Films set in Texas
American comedy films
2000s English-language films
2000s American films